Mikael Strandman (born 1966) is a Swedish politician who is a member of the Riksdag representing the Sweden Democrats.

Strandman graduated from the KTH Royal Institute of Technology with a Master's degree in engineering and worked as a civil engineer. He was elected to the Riksdag in 2018, representing Stockholm County and takes seat 246 in parliament. Strandman is also the local chairman of the Sweden Democrats in Norrtälje.

References 

Living people
Members of the Riksdag 2018–2022
1966 births
Members of the Riksdag from the Sweden Democrats
21st-century Swedish politicians